Auckland Theatre Company (ATC) is a professional theatre company in Auckland. It was founded in 1992 and since 2016 has been based in ASB Waterfront Theatre in the Wynyard Quarter in central Auckland.

History 
Auckland Theatre Company (ATC) was established following the bankruptcy of Mercury Theatre Company, Auckland's original professional theatre company which had been the largest subsidised company in the country. Founding Artistic Director was Simon Prast who was there from March 1992 until February 2003. In his time he directed and produced over 60 plays.

Before the opening the ASB Waterfront Theatre, ATC presented their shows in many venues around Auckland. The most-used venues were the Kenneth Maidment Theatre (commonly known as The Maidment) in the Auckland University campus and the Sky City Theatre. Other theatres ATC performed in were Q Theatre, Civic Theatre, Herald Theatre and the Basement Theatre.

About 
ATC presents a main bill season of six to eight plays to people from throughout Auckland and the Upper North Island each year.

Auckland Theatre Company offices are located in the lower ground floor of the Mt Eden War Memorial Hall in Balmoral, New Zealand. ATC refit the space to include their administration offices, box office and two rehearsal spaces and moved to this Dominion Road space from Quay Street in December 2010.

In 2009, the company's productions included the classic Bruce Mason play The Pohutukawa Tree, directed by McColl with lead actress Rena Owen. The cast included Stuart Devenie who has also worked as a director for the company.

In 2020 the Auckland Theatre Company presented an on-line production during the COVID-19 lock down, using the device of a Zoom meeting for the stage. It was adapted by Eli Kent and Eleanor Bishop, who also directed it, with rehearsals and performances carried out online.

Staffing 
ATC have about 30 staff in leadership, production, marketing and administration. The creative teams and casts for production come in on contract. 

The role of Artistic Director was held by Colin McColl from 2003 - 2021. Jonathan Bielski who has been on staff as CEO since 2019 has been appointed as the new Artistic Director. McColl's programme runs until the end of 2021 and Bielski is programming from 2022. 

Since November 2008, Philippa Campbell has been the ATC's Literary Manager.

ASB Waterfront Theatre 
In September 2016, Auckland Theatre Company opened their new home the ASB Waterfront Theatre. The ASB Waterfront Theatre is Auckland's new state-of-the-art performing arts facility located in the Wynyard Quarter. Comprising a 660-seat, international standard theatre, bar, café, gallery space and lounge, the ASB Waterfront Theatre is a purpose-built venue and the home of Auckland Theatre Company.

The Foundation Partners of the ASB Waterfront Theatre are Auckland Council, ASB Bank and AUT University. Major funders include Creative New Zealand and Foundation North. The project funders are the Edmiston Trust, The Lion Foundation and Lotto NZ. The Founding Corporate Partners are Kensington Swan and Villa Maria, and Platinum Corporate Partners are Cooper and Company, ECC Limited, and Moller Architects. Panuku Development Auckland and Auckland Theatre Company are Project Partners.

The premier show presented in the ASB Waterfront Theatre was the Auckland Theatre Company production of Billy Elliot the Musical, presented by ASB. The first preview was on October 7, 2016, and the official opening was on October 13, 2016.

References

External links
Auckland Theatre Company

Theatre companies in New Zealand
1992 establishments in New Zealand